The 2014 season was Sarawak's 1st season in the Malaysia Super League since relegated in 2012. Sarawak kicked off their 2014 season against the ATM in Selayang and lost 2–0.

This was Robert Alberts' fourth season in charge after taking over from Haji Mohd Zaki Sheikh Ahmad in 2011.

Sarawak competed in the two domestic cups – the FA Cup and the Malaysia Cup – where they start FA Cup tournaments in the first round. They reached the quarter-finals of the FA Cup before going out to Felda United on away goals rules.

Pre-season and friendlies

Indonesia pre-season tour 

Sarawak arranged pre season friendly in Indonesia with Indonesia clubs. Sarawak played 4 teams during the pre season. Sarawak and Arema Malang game was cancelled due to uncertain reasons.

Friendlies

2014 Malaysia Super League

Results summary

Matches

Results by matchday

2014 Malaysia FA Cup

The draw for the Malaysia FA Cup 2014 was held at Blue Wave Hotel, Shah Alam on 29 November 2013. In 2014 Malaysia FA Cup Sarawak FA will meet Penang at home on 21 January 2014.
Sarawak entered the FA Cup at the First Round stage. They were drawn against Premier League side Penang FA.

First round, Sarawak played Penang FA in their home turf. Sarawak struggle to beat Penang defensive line especially their on form goalkeeper G. Jeevananthan makes wonderful saves. Sarawak only in front after 76th minutes with Alireza Abbasfard put the ball into the net. Penang however have to play with 10 men after their players was sent off by referee. Despite with 10 men, Penang did not give up and equalize with wonderful free kicks. The match entered extra times and Gábor Gyepes makes a solo run to beat Jeeva.

Second round, Sarawak were drawn with Selangor FA and force to play an away game at MBPJ stadium, midweek 4.15 pm afternoon fixture. Sarawak were in front with stunning header from Zamri Morshidi in 33 minutes from a long throw from Ronny Harun. Sarawak were forced to play with 10 men after goalkeeper Sani Anuar Kamsani were sent off by referee after a reckless tackle. Despite attacking from the Selangor camp, Sarawak shown a solid defensive game throughout the game and through to Quarter finals.

Quarter finals, at Stadium Selayang Sarawak were drawn with Felda United. Sarawak first leg away game ended goalless with neither sides put the ball into the net. In Stadium Negeri, Sarawak were held drawn 2-2 and Felda were through to semis with away goals advantage.

2014 Malaysia Cup

Squad statistics

2014 First team squad

First team squad 

{| class="infobox" width="220px"
|-
|
|-
|<small>Sarawak FA most appearance players 4-1-3-2'</small>
|}

Goalscoring statistics

 Goalscorers 

Own goals

Transfer 2014For recent transfers, see List of Malaysian football transfers 2014.''.

In

Out

References 

Sarawak FA seasons
Sarawak